The following highways are numbered 3G:

United States
 New York State Route 3G (former)
Secondary State Highway 3G (Washington) (former)

See also
List of highways numbered 3